Nasir ud din Mahmud Shah (1229/1230 – 19 November 1266, reigned: 1246–1265) was the eighth sultan of the Mamluk Sultanate (Slave dynasty). The Tabaqat-i Nasiri, written by the court historian Minhaj-i-Siraj, is dedicated to him. His father-in-law Ghiyas ud din Balban handled the state affairs during his reign.

Early life 

Tabaqat-i Nasiri, written by the Sultan's court historian Minhaj-i-Siraj, calls him a son (ibn) of Iltutmish. According to Minhaj's account, Nasiruddin was born in the year of 626 Hijri (1229-1230 CE), in Delhi's Kasr-Bagh (the Garden Castle). His mother was a concubine ( who later, during his son's reign, was given the title of Malikah-i-Jahan). He was born sometime after the untimely death of Iltutmish's eldest son and heir apparent Nasir-ud-din Mahmud Shah. Iltutmish named the child after the deceased prince, and sent him and his mother to live in a palace in the Loni (or Luni) village.

Isami and Firishta describe the Sultan as a grandson of Iltutmish instead. Some modern scholars consider Minhaj as more reliable because he was a contemporary of the Sultan, while others believe that he was a son of Iltutmish's eldest son Nasiruddin, and was named after his father. For example, historians K. A. Nizami and J. L. Mehta believe that it is unlikely that Iltutmish sent his own son away from Delhi to the Loni village instead of bringing him up at the royal palace. Mehta states that Minhaj's statement that the child was "brought up and educated as a prince" indirectly implies that the child was not a prince by birth. Plus, Minhaj states that in 1225 CE, Sultan Nasiruddin's mother married an office named Qutlugh Khan. According to Nizami and Mehta, it is unlikely that a widow of Iltutmish married a petty noble: it is more likely that Sultan Nasiruddin's mother was a widow of Iltutmish's son Nasiruddin.

Reign 

On May 10,1242, Sultan Muiz ud din Bahram was dethroned. Amirs and Maliks took the possession of Delhi from him. Mahmud, along with his brother Jalal-ud-Din Masud Shah and nephew Ala ud din Masud (son of Ruknuddin Firuz) was brought to Firuzi castle, the royal residence, from the confinement of the white castle by the amirs and Ala ud din Masud was chosen as the Sultan. Both the brothers remained in confinement until September 1243, when Masud ordered them to be released and conferred upon Mahmud the city of Bharaij and its dependencies. Mahmud left Delhi and went to his fief with his mother. He undertook expeditions against the rebels in that territory and the adjacent mountains.

He ascended to the throne of Delhi Sultanate in 1246 at the tender age of 17 or 18 after the chiefs replaced Ala ud din Masud, when they felt that Masud began to behave as a tyrant.

As a ruler, Mahmud was known to be very religious, spending most of his time in prayer (namaz) and copying the Quran. However, it was actually his father-in-law and Naib, Ghiyas ud din Balban, who primarily dealt with the state affairs. His reign lasted from 1246 to 1265. After Mahmud's death in 1266, Balban (1266–87) rose to power as Mahmud had no surviving children to be his heir.

Personal life

Unlike many of his predecessors and successors, Mahmud strictly followed monogamy. He spent most of his time writing down verses of the Quran. He sold the handwritten copies and used the money for his personal expenses. Surprising enough, he had no servants to carry out his personal tasks. His wife had to cook the food for the family.

See also
Mamluk dynasty
History of India
Islamic history
List of Indian monarchs

References

Bibliography

External links
India Through the Ages
The Slave Dynasty

Sultans of the Mamluk dynasty (Delhi)
1266 deaths
1246 births
Indian Sunni Muslims
13th-century Indian monarchs